Stateside (released as Sinners in Germany) is a 2004 American biographical-drama film. It is an adventurous love story about a high school rich kid serving in the Marine Corps to avoid jail, who eventually falls in love with an actress with schizophrenia. Those around them ask them to keep their distance from each other, but both refuse. The film is based on a true story.

The film was released to theaters on May 21, 2004, and released on video/DVD on October 12, 2004.

Plot
Dorri Lawrence (Rachael Leigh Cook) is an actress and singer who resides in Hollywood, California. She has undiagnosed schizophrenia, which causes problems in her career. After another concert goes wrong due to her untreated disease, she is sent to get help for her schizophrenia.

Meanwhile, Mark Deloach (Jonathan Tucker) is a rich, high school kid miles away, attending a Catholic school. Alhough shy around girls and a good kid, he takes part in underage drinking. His brother, Gregory, who has secret sexual rendezvous with the prestigious Sue Dubois (Agnes Bruckner), has one of their dirty notes blamed on him. He and a buddy of his decide to pay him back by taking Sue back to her mother and reveal what's been going on with her and Gregory which they knew she will disapprove. In the process, a car crash occurs, resulting in the injury of both Sue and Father Concoff (Ed Begley Jr.), the principal of their high school.

Sue's mother, Mrs. Dubois (Carrie Fisher), decides to press charges against Mark. However, a deal is made to have Mark serve in the Marine Corps instead of jail time.

Mark departs to his training and finds that Staff Sergeant Skeer (Val Kilmer) has taken an interest in him as because Mark is using the Corps to escape jail time. Eventually, Mark satisfies the tough SDI, and Mark officially becomes a Marine.

Once back home, he finds himself cutting ties with his friends and befriends Sue, who is now in a half way house, and Dorri, who is her roommate. He also apologizes to Father Concoff, who accepts his apology, but the latter is still angry with what occurred. Mark and Dorri set a date with each other to go to a dance, but she doesn't get to go. Mark leaves her a gift. Later, he and Dorri go out on a date, and Mark loses his virginity to her.

Dorri and Mark keep in contact through letters and phone calls, but eventually Dorri's illness worsens, and she loses touch with reality. Friends and family beg Mark to help Dorri get treatment, but he opposes any suggestion that might separate them. Eventually, an intervention support group keeps the two away from each other.

Mark is deployed to overseas action, and he is injured in the bombing of the Marine Barracks in Beirut in 1983. He returns home with an honorable discharge. Apart for two years, Dorri contacts Mark in a hospital where he has been recuperating. They plan to marry and start a new life together.

Production
The film took eight weeks to shoot. To prepare for the role, Cook actually spent time with patients who had schizophrenia and read medical books from her father on this subject.

Anselmo, the writer/director, was a Marine, and the men who played Marines went through Marine boot camp to prepare for their roles.

Dorri Lawrence's character is based on actress Sarah Holcomb.

References

External links 
 
 
 

2004 films
Films about the United States Marine Corps
Films about virginity
Films shot in North Carolina
Films shot in New York (state)
Films scored by Joel McNeely
Films produced by Robert Greenhut
American romantic comedy films
Samuel Goldwyn Films films
2000s English-language films
2000s American films